Dopamine (stylised in all caps) is the debut studio album by American singer Mila J. It was released on April 7, 2017, through Silent Partner Entertainment and November Reign Records. The album is entirely produced by iRich, who also happens to be featured as a vocalist on the track "I Do Love You." The name of the project is inspired by the book This Is Your Brain On Music by Daniel Levitin.

Background
After being in two girl groups Gyrl and Dame Four and also appearing on tracks by RaRa, IMx, and Omarion, Mila J was set to release her original debut album Split Personality through The Ultimate Group and Universal Motown but it was ultimately shelved. The album featured a number of appearances from artists on the T.U.G. roster, including proteges and its associates, such as Marques Houston, Young Rome, Rufus Blaq, and The Underdogs. Most of the songs were later on used for her 2014 mixtape called Westside. From mid-2012 to early 2014, Mila returned to her career under the name Japollonia as an independent artist. She later reverted to Mila J and released her debut extended play (EP) Made in L.A. (2014). The EP was originally intended to be released as a full-length album.

In November 2015, Mila told Complex that her debut album would be released in 2016, stating: "It's been a while since anyone has heard something new from me, so I wanted to drop some new music for my fans while I'm working on my first full length studio album that will be released next year 2016." Instead of an album, she released her second EP titled, 213 on June 16, 2016.

On April 3, 2017, Mila confirmed the album title to be Dopamine. Mila told Essence magazine the album title was inspired by Daniel Levitin's book This Is Your Brain On Music: The Science of a Human Obsession: "It really broke down how our brain reacts to music, what's released when we hear a song, and why we like certain music," she said. "Dopamine is that chemical that's released when things just feel good. It is that favorite song and that favorite band. And, I just feel very very happy and free."

Promotion

Singles
The first promotional single called "Fuckboy" was released on February 3, 2017. The track lyrically blasts men who are only in relationships for sex, with Rap-Up stating that the anti-“Fuckboy” anthem "allows the R&B songstress to flex on an ex while empowering others to do the same." The track has also been described as a "funky mid-tempo track". The official lead single, "Move" was later released on February 14, 2017. Its music video was unveiled on April 7 and was directed by Mila herself. The album's second single "La La Land" was released on April 3, 2017, and premiered via The Fader.

On April 21, 2017, Mila released a self-directed music video for the song "New Crib". The music video shows Mila with a braided hairstyle, posing in front of a white backdrop. Also, an unbraided version of her is seen packing her belongings and moving into a new living space.

The third and final single from the project "No Fux" was unveiled on May 12 accompanied by its self-directed music video. Speaking to Essence about the song and video, Mila says, "I wanted to present it in a pretty way. It sounds pretty, but what I’m saying is pretty real. And, as you follow the story, towards the end ‘No Fux’ is kind of showcasing those vulnerable moments in love."

Tour

To precede and promote the album, Mila embarked on the Move Tour through the United States. The 19-city even began on March 24, 2017 in Miami, Florida. “This tour will be fun and all about the fans that’s why I wanted to do it. So I want all of y’all to come out and have a good time with me! See YOU soon,” Mila said in a press release.

Critical reception

Dopamine was met with generally positive reviews from music critics. At Album of the Year, a website that aggregate reviews of music albums, which assigns normalized scores based on user ratings, the album received an average score of 60, based on 8 ratings. Adelle Platon of Billboard said, "The sassy hip-hop songstress may have not achieved the same success as her fellow R&B music associates such as two-time collaborator B.o.B, labelmate Marques Houston and her sister Jhené Aiko, but her slick hip-hop style and raunchy music outshines most of them on this authentic body of work as she shows off her sopranic soulful vocals behind trap-influenced beats." Kevin Goddard of HotNewHipHop said, "Laced with 13 tracks in total, the follow up to last year’s 213 EP features explicit slow jams and groovy bops. The album also features a lone appearance from multi-talented LA artist I Rich, who appears on the track I Do Love You." Jon Powell of Respect stated, "Like her previous music efforts, Los Angeles native Mila J's new album Dopamine contains radio-friendly, vulnerable and rhythmic music with explicit lyrical content. Mila J is not really considered a "sanger" but I like the music paired with her voice because it works for her. Furthermore, this is a real smooth album. The deeper you go into it gets really smooth and tranquil. For the grown and sexy." Rap-Up.com added to their blog, "Mila J is giving fans a Dopamine rush with the release of her latest project." Elle Breezy of Singersroom said that Dopamine features "slow jams and bangers in the style of her carefree brand of female empowerment."

In 2017, Vibe named the album number 2 out of 17 albums listed as a part of its "Favorite Underrated Albums of 2017" list and wrote: "Mila J is an underappreciated gem, so we valued our conversation with her. Dopamine is a fun, energetic journey that boosts self-confidence. The rhythms, the vibes, the pulsations I got from this record is just indescribable. Pure magic from start to finish.".

Track listing
All tracks produced by iRich.

Sampling credits
 "La La Land" samples the song "Delay" by JMSN from his 2014 eponymous album JMSN.

Charts

Release history

See also
 Mila J discography
 List of 2017 albums

References

External links
 Dopamine on Spotify
 Dopamine on Tidal

2017 debut albums
Mila J albums
Hip hop albums by American artists